MV Cambria was a twin screw motor vessel operated by the British Transport Commission from 1948 to 1962 and British Rail from 1962 to 1976.  Together with her sister ship the MV Hibernia she served the Holyhead to Dún Laoghaire route across the Irish Sea.

History
She was built by Harland and Wolff of Belfast, launched in 1948 for the British Transport Commission and started service in 1949.
In 1951 she was fitted with Denny-Brown stabilisers. In 1964–65 they were refurbished with airline style seating. Some cabins and staterooms were removed and replaced with second-class lounges, and a cafeteria. The screened areas were extended to provide further covered seating, and the first and second class smokerooms were converted into a tea lounge.

She was sold in 1976 to the Orri Navigation Company in Saudi Arabia and became the Al Taif.

References

1948 ships
Passenger ships of the United Kingdom
Ships built in Belfast
Ships of British Rail
Ships built by Harland and Wolff